Probištip Municipality is an urban municipality in eastern North Macedonia. Probištip is also the name of the city where the municipal seat is found. This municipality is part of the Eastern Statistical Region.

Geography
The municipality borders Kratovo Municipality to the north, Kočani and Češinovo-Obleševo municipalities to the east, Sveti Nikole Municipality to the west, Štip and Karbinci municipalities to the south.

The municipality spreads over the middle and lower part of the line of the Zletovska River.

Demographics
Following the 2003 territorial division of North Macedonia, the rural Zletovo Municipality was attached to Probištip Municipality. The former had 3,428 residents while the latter had 12,963 inhabitants. The combined municipality, thus, had 16,193 inhabitants. Ethnic groups in the municipality include the following:

Macedonians = 15,977 (98.7%)
others = 216 (1.3%)

Inhabited places

Economy

Mining
The main economic objects in the municipality are the lead and zinc mines “Zletovo”, now called “Indo Minerals and Metals” which were in continual exploitation from 1970. They have been bought by a Bulmak, a large Bulgarian mining company that has modernized the mines,, which are working in full capacity.

References

External links
 Official website

 
Municipalities of North Macedonia
Eastern Statistical Region